La catena d'Adone (The Chain of Adonis) is the only surviving opera by the Italian composer Domenico Mazzocchi. It was commissioned by Cardinal Ippolito Aldobrandini and first performed at the Palazzo Conti, Rome on February 12, 1626. The libretto, in a prologue and five acts, is by Ottavio Tronsarelli and is based on episodes from Giambattista Marino's epic poem Adone (1623).

Historical importance
La catena d'Adone was an important step in the development of Roman opera. The demarcation between recitative and aria grew more distinct in this work as Mazzocchi tried to escape what he called the "monotony" of Florentine opera.

Roles
The prologue includes Apollo (tenor) and  cyclopes. The opera itself has roles for the enchantress Falsirena (soprano); Adone (alto); Plutone (bass); Venere (soprano); Idonia (soprano) and Arsete (bass), advisers of Falsirena ; Oraspe (tenor) ; Amore (soprano) ; Eco (alto) ; nymphs and shepherds. At the premiere,  Adone was sung by the 'artificial' contralto (i.e. countertenor) Lorenzo Sances.  Falsirena was sung by the composer and castrato Loreto Vittori.

Synopsis
In the prologue, Apollo descends from the clouds and laments Venere's desertion of her husband, the god Vulcan, for the young Adone. In the opera proper (drawn from Cantos XII and XIII of Marino's poem), Adone has to flee from Venere's former lover, the god Marte, and takes refuge in the land of the enchantress Falsirena, who falls in love with him. Falsirena keeps him captive in her realm by means of a magic, invisible chain. She asks Plutone to find out who Adone's love is, then pretends to be Venere. But the real goddess arrives, frees Adone and binds Falsirena to a rock with her own chain.

Recordings 
La catena d'Adone, Reinoud Van Mechelen (Adone), Luciana Mancini (Falsirena), Merel Elishevah Kriegsman (Venere/Ninfa), Catherine Lybaert (Amore/Ninfa), Scherzi Musicali conducted by Nicolas Achten (2 CDs, Alpha, 2010)

Notes

Sources
A Short History of Opera by Donald Jay Grout (Columbia University Press, 2003 ed.)
Marina Vaccarini, Catena d'Adone, La, in Gelli, Piero & Poletti Filippo eds. (2007). Dizionario dell'Opera 2008, Milan: Baldini Castoldi Dalai, pp. 208-209.  (in Italian; reproduced online at Opera Manager or Del Teatro
Magazine de l'opéra baroque (in French)

External links
 Libretto in Italian

Italian-language operas
Operas
1626 operas
Operas by Domenico Mazzocchi